Donogh is a given name. Notable people with the name include:

Donogh Dáll Ó Derrig, aka Blind Donogh O'Derrick, Irish rapparee, executed December 1656
Donogh O'Brien, 4th Earl of Thomond (died 1624), Irish nobleman and soldier noted for his loyalty to the English Crown
Donogh O'Malley (1921–1968), Irish Fianna Fáil politician
Donogh Rees (born 1959), New Zealand actress